Centrocidaris is a monotypic genus of sea urchins belonging to the family Cidaridae. The only species is Centrocidaris doederleini. Their armour is covered with spines. Centrocidaris doederleini was first scientifically described in 1898 by Alexander Agassiz.

The species is found in the Caribbean.

See also 
 Cassidulus mitis
 Cassidulus infidus
 Centrostephanus asteriscus

References

Cidaridae
Taxa named by Alexander Agassiz